The Beat with Ari Melber is an American news and politics program hosted by Ari Melber, who is the chief legal correspondent for the network MSNBC. It airs weekdays at 6 PM ET.

Guest hosts for the series include Mehdi Hasan, Jason Johnson, Alicia Menendez, Katie Phang, and Ayman Mohyeldin.

Format 
The show features news reporting, one-on-one interviews, panels, and special reports by the anchor. The show includes a "Fallback Friday" segment every Friday.

History 
The Beat with Ari Melber was announced after Greta Van Susteren's program For the Record with Greta ended. The network tapped Melber as one of its "most valuable utility players" for anchoring the 6pm slot, according to the Associated Press, an effort to shore up an hour when MSNBC has historically drawn less viewers, trailing cable stars Bret Baier and Wolf Blitzer, who host the 6 p.m. shows on Fox News and CNN. Upon its debut, it was part of MSNBC's evening ratings surge among key demographics on cable television, and went on to draw a larger nightly audience than any hour of CNN.

The Beat with Ari Melber has been noted for its reporting on Facebook's role in elections and journalism. Mediaite, an American Media publication, wrote about its coverage of Facebook's role in the Philippines election, noting "host Ari Melber has carved out an important niche as arguably the leading critic of Facebook CEO Mark Zuckerberg in all of television."

Notable interviews Melber has conducted include U.S. Senators Kamala Harris, Elizabeth Warren, Jeff Merkley, Richard Blumenthal, Dick Durbin, Mark Warner, and Cory Booker; Sheriff Joe Arpaio, who had a newsworthy legal exchange on the show, former White House adviser Stephen Bannon, former Trump aide Sam Nunberg, who later credited the interview for his decision to cooperate with Special Counsel Robert Mueller, also Donald Trump's former lawyer Michael Cohen has appeared on the show multiple times and musician Talib Kweli, who joined a discussion with Fat Joe and conservative Bill Kristol that Fortune called "one of the most delightfully diverse panels ever. Really."

The show also features musical and cultural guests, such as 50 Cent, Method Man, Vic Mensa, French Montana, Black Panther actor Winston Duke, Sean Penn, novelist Alice Walker, Andrew Leon Talley, DJs Stretch Armstrong, Bobbito Garcia and Jay Smooth, Desus and The Kid Mero (who both co-host Desus & Mero), and the rapper Havoc, (who noted Melber quoted his lyrics to explain a legal concept and announced a forthcoming Mobb Deep album in an interview on the show).

Reception 
The Detroit Free Press named The Beat with Ari Melber to its "best" TV shows of 2017, noting its reporting "helped untangle the implications of Robert Mueller's Russia investigation, revealing the actual law obscured by the partisan posturing of so many cable news formats."

TVNewser reported that in 2017, The Beat with Ari Melber "defeated CNN in total viewers this year, and delivered the network's largest yearly audience ever" for its 6pm timeslot. Forbes reported in 2017, the show delivered "MSNBC's best rating ever for the time slot" and "not just because of an overall Trump Bump bringing a rise in viewership," noting "MSNBC saw total day growth of 38%" in ratings, while "Melber's 6 p.m. slot saw growth of 56%."

TVNewser noted in February 2018, The Beat and Deadline: White House "posted record viewership in MSNBC history for their timeslots," and The Beat continued its ratings growth in 2018, averaging 1.7 million viewers per night in September 2018—more viewers than CNN's 6pm show and more viewers than every other CNN show in prime time.

References

External links 
 
  (MSNBC News; July 29, 2022)

2017 American television series debuts
2010s American television news shows
2020s American television news shows
2010s American television talk shows
2020s American television talk shows
MSNBC original programming